Guerrero is a rural barrio in the municipality of Aguadilla, Puerto Rico. Its population in 2010 was 3,406.

History
Puerto Rico was ceded by Spain in the aftermath of the Spanish–American War under the terms of the Treaty of Paris of 1898 and became an unincorporated territory of the United States. In 1899, the United States Department of War conducted a census of Puerto Rico finding that the population of Guerrero barrio was 638.

Features
The Guerrero Correctional Institution, one of the largest men's prisons in Puerto Rico, is located in Guerrero.

 (Guerrero Lake) is a 32,000-square-meter reservoir located in Guerrero. Built in the 1930s, it is fed by the Guajataca Lake.

Sectors
Barrios (which are like minor civil divisions) in turn are further subdivided into smaller local populated place areas/units called sectores (sectors in English). The types of sectores may vary, from normally sector to urbanización to reparto to barriada to residencial, among others.

The following sectors are in Guerrero barrio:

See also

 List of communities in Puerto Rico
 List of barrios and sectors of Aguadilla, Puerto Rico

References

External links

Barrios of Aguadilla, Puerto Rico